was a town located in Tomata District, Okayama Prefecture, Japan.

As of 2003 (before the merger), the village had an estimated population of 1,732 and a density of 13.24 persons per km2. The total area was 130.83 km2.

On March 1, 2005, Okutsu, along with the villages of Kamisaibara and Tomi (all from Tomata District), was merged into the expanded town of Kagamino.

Dissolved municipalities of Okayama Prefecture